This is the discography of British composer Kenneth Hesketh.

Contemporary Classical

Wind

Brass

Seasonal

References

Discographies of classical composers